Heartache is Singaporean singer Kit Chan's first album in Taiwan. It consists of 10 tracks, of which six are from her debut album, Do Not Destroy The Harmony.

Track listing

1994 albums